Paraschistura is a genus of stone loaches most of which occur in Central, South and Western Asia.

Species
There are currently 23 recognized species in this genus:
 Paraschistura abdolii Freyhof, Sayyadzadeh, Esmaeili & Geiger, 2015  
 Paraschistura alepidota (Mirza & Bănărescu, 1970)
 Paraschistura alta (Nalbant & Bianco, 1998) 
 Paraschistura aredvii Freyhof, Sayyadzadeh, Esmaeili & Geiger, 2015 
 Paraschistura bampurensis (A. M. Nikolskii, 1900)
 Paraschistura chrysicristinae (Nalbant, 1998) 
 Paraschistura cristata (L. S. Berg, 1898) (Turkmenian crested loach) 
 Paraschistura delvarii Mousavi-Sabet & Eagderi, 2015 
 Paraschistura hormuzensis Freyhof, Sayyadzadeh, Esmaeili & Geiger, 2015 
 Paraschistura ilamensis Vatandoust & Eagderi, 2015 
 Paraschistura kessleri (Günther, 1889) (Kessler's loach)
 Paraschistura lepidocaulis (Mirza & Nalbant, 1981)
 Paraschistura lindbergi (Bănărescu & Mirza, 1965)
 Paraschistura microlabra (Mirza & Nalbant, 1981)
 Paraschistura montana McClelland, 1838
 Paraschistura naseeri (N. ud-D. Ahmad & Mirza, 1963)
 Paraschistura naumanni Freyhof, Sayyadzadeh, Esmaeili & Geiger, 2015 
 Paraschistura nielseni (Nalbant & Bianco, 1998)
 Paraschistura pasatigris Freyhof, Sayyadzadeh, Esmaeili & Geiger, 2015 
 Paraschistura prashari (Hora, 1933)
 Paraschistura punjabensis (Hora, 1923)
 Paraschistura susiani Freyhof, Sayyadzadeh, Esmaeili & Geiger, 2015 
 Paraschistura turcmenica (L. S. Berg, 1932) 
 Paraschistura turcomana (G. V. Nikolskii, 1947)

References

Nemacheilidae
Taxa named by Alexander Nikolsky